Thomas Sutton House, also known as the House on Game Preserve, is a historic home located at Woodland Beach, Kent County, Delaware.  It was built about 1733, and is a two-story stuccoed brick house, constructed on a single pile, hall and parlor plan.  It has a lower two-story wing that extends the axis of the main house.  It serves as a residence and office for the personnel of the Woodland Beach Wildlife Area.

It was listed on the National Register of Historic Places in 1973.

References

Houses on the National Register of Historic Places in Delaware
Houses completed in 1733
Houses in Kent County, Delaware
National Register of Historic Places in Kent County, Delaware